Prion Humour Classics are a series of small-format hardback novels published by Prion Books in the UK published by Barry Winkleman.

References

Lists of novels